Yannick Ossok (born 6 June 1986 in Cameroon) is a Cameroonian footballer who plays for Pargas IF in Finland as of 2016.

Career

Thailand

Snapped up by Police United mid-season 2012, Ossok was picked for the Thai Premier League foreign all-stars team for a friendly opposing Thailand that year and made the Thai Premier League's Round 18 Team of the Week for his defensive performances which prevented Bangkok United from taking three points.

Malta

With Mosta for 2011–12, the Cameroonian was Man of the Match by holding Birkirkara 0-0 but slapped with a two-match suspension for gratuitous violence ahead of the Maltese FA Trophy quarter finals. Returning to Mosta in 2014–15, he finished the season with Għajnsielem, wearing the number 15.

Finland

Examined by Pallo-Iirot in spring 2009, the centre-back came to terms on a deal with them lasting until the end of the year, penciling in an agreement with Salon Palloilijat that December. before heading to Malta and putting a dent in their defensive line.

References

External links 
 Ossok: Jag trivs bra i laget 
 Finnish Wikipedia Page 
 at Soccerway

1986 births
Living people
Association football defenders
Mosta F.C. players
Yannick Ossok
Expatriate footballers in Finland
Yannick Ossok
Yannick Ossok
Yannick Ossok
Salon Palloilijat players
Cameroonian footballers
Expatriate footballers in Malta
Expatriate footballers in Thailand
Għajnsielem F.C. players
Maltese Premier League players
Pallo-Iirot players
Cameroonian expatriate footballers
Pargas Idrottsförening players